Heterophotinus is a genus of fireflies from the Caribbean & South America. They were previously known under a variety of genera, including Photinus.

Species list
 Heterophotinus alius Kazantsev, 2006
 Heterophotinus constanzae Kazantsev, 2006
 Heterophotinus dubiosus (Leng et Mutchler, 1922)
 Heterophotinus glaucus (Olivier, 1790)
 Heterophotinus lengi (Mutchler, 1923)
 Heterophotinus limpioensis Kazantsev, 2006
 Heterophotinus merielae Kazantsev, 2006
 Heterophotinus nigricollis Kazantsev, 2006
 Heterophotinus quadrimaculatus (Laporte, 1840)
 Heterophotinus quadrinotatus (Motschulsky, 1854)
 Heterophotinus triangularis (E.Olivier, 1912)
 Heterophotinus viridicolor Kazantsev, 2006
 Heterophotinus vittatus (Olivier, 1790)

References

Lampyridae genera
Lampyridae
Beetles of North America